Matias Haaranen (born 11 July 1996) is a Finnish ice hockey defenceman. He is currently playing with the Ravensburg Towerstars in the German DEL2.

Haaranen made his Liiga debut playing with HPK during the 2014–15 Liiga season.

References

External links

1996 births
Living people
Finnish ice hockey defencemen
HPK players
Lempäälän Kisa players
People from Riihimäki
TuTo players
Sportspeople from Kanta-Häme
21st-century Finnish people